This was the first edition of the tournament.

Tristan Lamasine and Franko Škugor won the title after defeating Uladzimir Ignatik and Jozef Kovalík 6–2, 6–2 in the final.

Seeds

Draw

References
 Main Draw

Verrazzano Open - Doubles